Ballywalter Recreation Football Club is a Northern Irish, intermediate football club playing in Division 1B of the Northern Amateur Football League. The club is based in Ballywalter, County Down, and was formed in 1977. The club has played in the Irish Cup.

Honours

Junior honours
County Antrim Junior Shield: 2
2000-01, 2007–08

References

External links
  Club website]

Association football clubs in Northern Ireland
Association football clubs established in 1977
Association football clubs in County Down
Northern Amateur Football League clubs
1977 establishments in Northern Ireland